Nikolai Ivanovich Getman or Mykola Ivanovich Hetman, an artist, was born in 1917 in Kharkiv, Ukraine, and died at his home in Orel, Russia, in August 2004. He was a prisoner from 1946 to 1953 in forced labor camps in Siberia and Kolyma, where he survived as a result of his ability to sketch for the propaganda requirements of the authorities. He is remembered as one of few artists who has recorded the life of prisoners in the Gulag in the form of paintings.

Early life 
Getman had a difficult childhood in Ukraine, often close to starvation, but from the very beginning was able to develop his natural artistic talents. After graduating from technical college in 1937, he attended the Kharkiv Art College in order to become a professional artist. Three years later he was called up to join the Red Army, where he served until the end of World War II. Shortly after his return, he was arrested for participating in anti-Soviet propaganda as a result of a caricature of Stalin one of his friends had drawn on a cigarette box. He was convicted in January 1946 and sent to the Gulag prison camps in Siberia.

The Gulag legacy 
During the eight years Getman spent at Taishetlag (Siberia) and Svitlag (Kolyma), he started to develop his plan to record the horrors of the camp conditions in the form of paintings. While he could not paint openly in the camps, he took careful note of all that transpired. Even when he started to paint after his release in 1953, he still had to do so in secret as he would otherwise have been convicted once again, perhaps even sentenced to death. In his own words: "I undertook the task because I was convinced that it was my duty to leave behind a testimony to the fate of the millions of prisoners who died"

The Heritage Foundation provides access to all 50 of Getman's paintings together with explanations of their significance. Their impact is especially effective in providing visual representations of the conduct of the camps, the harsh working conditions, the severe climate and the fate of the prisoners themselves.

The Gulag paintings were not shown until 1993 at a private exhibition in the gallery of the Russian Artists' Union in Orel. In 1995, there was a special ceremony in the Turgenev Theatre in Orel where a Getman exhibition entitled "The Gulag in the Eyes of an Artist" was opened in the presence of the artist and Aleksandr Solzhenitsyn, author of The Gulag Archipelago.

In June 1997, the private exhibition "The Gulag in the Eyes of an Artist" was displayed at the U.S. Congress in Washington, D.C.

Other artistic activities 

In 1953, after his release, Getman worked as an artist in the House of Culture in Yagodnoe in Magadan Oblast. In 1956, he took part in an exhibition of the works of artists from Siberia and the Kolyma region and became a candidate for the USSR Union of Artists in 1957. In April 1963, he took part in the Second Congress of the USSR Artists' Union in Moscow, and in 1964 became a member of the USSR Artists' Union. He helped organize the Magadan Artists' Union and became director of the Magadan section of the Arts Foundation of the RSFSR from 1963 to 1966. In 1976, he moved from Magadan to Orel, where he had a studio in the local branch of the Russian Artists' Union. During this period he was also required to paint a number of portraits of political figures.

He participated in several art exhibitions across the Soviet Union as well as in Germany, Bulgaria, Finland and The Netherlands.

The artist's plea 

Getman was quite clear about his goal: "Some may say that the Gulag is a forgotten part of history and that we do not need to be reminded. But I have witnessed monstrous crimes. It is not too late to talk about them and reveal them. It is essential to do so. Some have expressed fear on seeing some of my paintings that I might end up in Kolyma again—this time for good. But the people must be reminded...of one of the harshest acts of political repression in the Soviet Union. My paintings may help achieve this."

A book with his paintings was published by Jamestown Foundation in 2001.

Bibliography 
 Getman, Nikolai: The Gulag Collection: Paintings of the Soviet Penal System, The Jamestown Foundation, 2001, 131 p.,

See also
Eufrosinia Kersnovskaya

Footnotes

Further reading
"THE GULAG COLLECTION: PAINTINGS OF THE SOVIET PENAL SYSTEM BY FORMER PRISONER NIKOLAI GETMAN" (retrieved December 15, 2015)
"Getman Paintings: The Soviet GULAG @ Heritage Foundation  (retrieved December 15, 2015)

1917 births
2004 deaths
Artists from Kharkiv
Soviet painters
Ukrainian people of World War II
Russian people of World War II
Soviet military personnel of World War II
Ukrainian prisoners and detainees
Soviet prisoners and detainees
Russian prisoners and detainees
Gulag detainees
20th-century Russian painters
Russian male painters
20th-century Ukrainian painters
20th-century Ukrainian male artists
20th-century Russian male artists
Ukrainian male painters